The 15th South American Youth Championships in Athletics were held at the Estadio El Salitre in Bogotá, Colombia from November 4–5, 2000.  For the first time, the competition was open for athletes from the age group under 18 (U18) rather than under 17 (U17) as before.

Medal summary
Medal winners are published for boys and girls.  Complete results can be found on the "World Junior Athletics History" website.

All results are marked as "affected by altitude" (A), because Bogotá is located at 2,625 metres above sea level.

Men

Women

Medal table (unofficial)

Participation (unofficial)
Detailed result lists can be found on the "World Junior Athletics History" website.  An unofficial count yields the number of about 228 athletes from about 12 countries:  

 (22)
 (6)
 (63)
 (22)
 (39)
 (29)
 (2)
 Panama (3)
 (3)
 Peru (8)
 (11)
 (20)

References

External links
World Junior Athletics History

South American U18 Championships in Athletics
2000 in Colombian sport
South American U18 Championships
2000 in South American sport
International athletics competitions hosted by Colombia
2000 in youth sport